Darreh Sabz (also known as Darreh Gorg, Darreh Gurg, and Darreh-ye Gorg) is a village in Esfandan Rural District, in the Central District of Komijan County, Markazi Province, Iran. At the 2006 census, its population was 149, in 42 families.

References 

Populated places in Komijan County